Milenio Televisión is a Mexican television cable news channel owned by Grupo Multimedios. The news programming uses the resources of the Milenio newspaper, one of the largest in the country. Programming is 24 hours a day, through news, analysis and specialized programs. The channel is available in various pay TV systems throughout Mexico and the US, and on the internet. Milenio has also been available on the second digital subchannels of Multimedios television stations, as well as those of XHIJ-TDT and XHILA-TDT.

The network produces newscasts specifically for Los Angeles called Noticias 22 Milenio. The newscasts air weekdays from 11 a.m. to 12 p.m., daily from 7 to 8 p.m. and daily from 10 to 11:30 PM (Pacific Time). on KWHY-TV 22.

During 2012, Milenio Television began broadcasting on Digital Television on 12.2 of XHAW-TDT; until 2015 it moved to 12.2 of XHSAW-TDT. In 2017, it changes to channel 13.2. In February 2018, due to the change of XHAW-TDT from 12.1 to 6.1, XHSAW-TDT returns to 12.1 and Milenio Television in 12.2.

In 2016, Milenio Televisión's open signal increased when it received authorization from the IFT to be transmitted as part of the multiprogramming of the main channel in the cities of: Torreón, León, Nuevo Laredo, Ciudad Victoria, Tampico and Matamoros.

As a result of the IFT-6 tender, Multimedia won frequencies in Mexico City, Guadalajara, Durango, Ciudad Juarez and Monclova, Milenio Televisión is available at stations in those cities.

|-

|-

|-

|-

|-

|-

|-

|-

|-

|-

|-

|-

References

External links
Milenio Televisión

24-hour television news channels in Mexico
Grupo Multimedios
Spanish-language television stations in Mexico
2008 establishments in Mexico
Television channels and stations established in 2008